The Democratic Union (Unión Democrática) was a political party in Guatemala. At the legislative elections, 9 November 2003, the party won 2.2% of the popular vote and 2 out of 158 seats. In the legislative elections held on 9 September 2007, the party secured 1.41% of the votes in the race for national-list deputies and, save for defections, will have only one seat in the 2008-12 Congress.  In the presidential election of the same day, its candidate Manuel Conde Orellana won 0.76% of the popular vote.

Conservative parties in Guatemala
Defunct political parties in Guatemala
Political parties with year of disestablishment missing
Political parties with year of establishment missing